Vadonaclia is a genus of moths in the subfamily Arctiinae. It contains the single species Vadonaclia marginepuncta, which is found on Madagascar.

References

Arctiinae